The Italian general election of 2008 took place on 13–14 April 2008.

The People of Freedom was the largest party in Sicily with 46.6%, while the Democratic Party came second with 25.4%.

Results

Chamber of Deputies
|-
|- bgcolor="#E9E9E9"
!rowspan="1" align="left" valign="top"|Coalitions leaders
!rowspan="1" align="center" valign="top"|votes
!rowspan="1" align="center" valign="top"|votes (%)
!rowspan="1" align="center" valign="top"|seats
!rowspan="1" align="left" valign="top"|Parties
!rowspan="1" align="center" valign="top"|votes
!rowspan="1" align="center" valign="top"|votes (%)
!rowspan="1" align="center" valign="top"|seats
|-
!rowspan="2" align="left" valign="top"|Silvio Berlusconi
|rowspan="2" valign="top"|1,534,037
|rowspan="2" valign="top"|54.3
|rowspan="2" valign="top"|32

|align="left"|The People of Freedom
|valign="top"|1,316,868
|valign="top"|46.6
|valign="top"|28
|-
|align="left"|Movement for Autonomy
|valign="top"|217,169
|valign="top"|7.7
|valign="top"|4

|-
!rowspan="2" align="left" valign="top"|Walter Veltroni
|rowspan="2" valign="top"|814,267
|rowspan="2" valign="top"|28.8
|rowspan="2" valign="top"|16

|align="left"|Democratic Party
|valign="top"|718,494
|valign="top"|25.4
|valign="top"|14
|-
|align="left"|Italy of Values
|valign="top"|95,773
|valign="top"|3.4
|valign="top"|2

|-
!rowspan="1" align="left" valign="top"|Pier Ferdinando Casini
|rowspan="1" valign="top"|264,953
|rowspan="1" valign="top"|9.4
|rowspan="1" valign="top"|5

|align="left"|Union of the Centre
|valign="top"|264,953
|valign="top"|9.4
|valign="top"|5

|-
!rowspan="1" align="left" valign="top"|Fausto Bertinotti
|rowspan="1" valign="top"|74,457
|rowspan="1" valign="top"|2.6
|rowspan="1" valign="top"|-

|align="left"|The Left – The Rainbow
|valign="top"|74,457
|valign="top"|2.6
|valign="top"|-

|-
!rowspan="1" align="left" valign="top"|Daniela Santanché
|rowspan="1" valign="top"|57,256
|rowspan="1" valign="top"|2.0
|rowspan="1" valign="top"|-

|align="left"|The Right
|valign="top"|57,256
|valign="top"|2.0
|valign="top"|-

|-
!rowspan="1" align="left" valign="top"|Enrico Boselli
|rowspan="1" valign="top"|17,365
|rowspan="1" valign="top"|0.6
|rowspan="1" valign="top"|-

|align="left"|Socialist Party
|valign="top"|17,365
|valign="top"|0.6
|valign="top"|-

|-
!rowspan="1" align="left" valign="top"|Others
|rowspan="1" valign="top"|61,612
|rowspan="1" valign="top"|2.2
|rowspan="1" valign="top"|-

|align="left"|Others
|valign="top"|61,612
|valign="top"|2.2
|valign="top"|-

|-
|- bgcolor="#E9E9E9"
!rowspan="1" align="left" valign="top"|Total coalitions
!rowspan="1" align="right" valign="top"|2,823,947
!rowspan="1" align="right" valign="top"|100.0
!rowspan="1" align="right" valign="top"|53
!rowspan="1" align="left" valign="top"|Total parties
!rowspan="1" align="right" valign="top"|2,823,947
!rowspan="1" align="right" valign="top"|100.0
!rowspan="1" align="right" valign="top"|53
|}
Source: Ministry of the Interior

Senate

MPs elected in Sicily

Elections in Sicily
2008 elections in Italy
April 2008 events in Europe